Lomariopsis marginata is a fern in the family Lomariopsidaceae. It is native to Brazil and possibly French Guiana.

References

Polypodiales